Julien Darui (16 February 1916 – 13 December 1987) was a French football goalkeeper, who had stints as a coach after his playing career.

International career
Darui was born in Luxembourg during World War I, to parents of Portuguese and Italian descent, and emigrated to France at a young age. Darui was capped 25 times for France. In 1999, he was elected best French goalkeeper of the century by L'Équipe.

Honours

Player
CO Roubaix-Tourcoing
French championship: 1947

Red Star Olympique
Coupe de France: 1942

References

External links
 
 
 

1916 births
1987 deaths
People from Differdange
French footballers
France international footballers
Luxembourgian footballers
French people of Portuguese descent
French people of Italian descent
Luxembourgian people of Portuguese descent
Luxembourgian people of Italian descent
Luxembourgian emigrants to France
Association football goalkeepers
Red Star F.C. players
Lille OSC players
Montpellier HSC players
Ligue 1 players
French football managers
Montpellier HSC managers
Olympique Lyonnais managers
1938 FIFA World Cup players
CO Roubaix-Tourcoing managers
OFC Charleville players
CO Roubaix-Tourcoing players
Olympique Lillois players